Noues de Sienne (literally Swamps of Sienne) is a commune in the department of Calvados, northwestern France. The municipality was established on 1 January 2017 by merger of the former communes of Saint-Sever-Calvados (the seat), Champ-du-Boult, Courson, Fontenermont, Le Gast, Le Mesnil-Benoist, Le Mesnil-Caussois, Mesnil-Clinchamps, Saint-Manvieu-Bocage and Sept-Frères.

Population

See also 
Communes of the Calvados department

References 

Communes of Calvados (department)
Populated places established in 2017
2017 establishments in France